Benjamin F. Holmes (April 3, 1858 – May 11, 1949) was an American Negro league third baseman in the 1880s and 1890s.

A native of King and Queen County, Virginia, Holmes played several seasons for the Cuban Giants between 1886 and 1891. He died in Washington, D.C., in 1949 at age 91.

References

External links
 and Seamheads

1858 births
1949 deaths
Cuban Giants players
Baseball third basemen
Baseball players from Virginia
People from King and Queen County, Virginia
20th-century African-American people